Qullqiri (Aymara and Quechua qullqi silver, -ri a suffix, Hispanicized spelling Collquere) is a mountain in the Cusco Region in Peru, about  high. It is situated in the  Paucartambo Province, Colquepata District (Qullqipata). Qullqiri lies north-west of the lake Kiskay (Quescay).

References 

Mountains of Peru
Mountains of Cusco Region